Baldiny is a Russian masculine surname; its feminine counterpart is Baldina. It may refer to:

Aleksander Baldin (born 1984), Estonian swimmer
Alexander Baldin (physicist) (1926–2001), Russian physicist
Alyssa Baldin (born 1990), Canadian hockey player
Irina Baldina (1922–2009), Russian painter
Lucas Baldin (born 1991), Brazilian football player
Baldina, South Australia

See also
Baldin Collection, a group of masterpieces moved from Nazi Germany to the Soviet Union by Victor Baldin

Russian-language surnames